In game theory, the Helly metric is used to assess the distance between two strategies.  It is named for Eduard Helly.

Consider a game , between player I and II.

(in other words, if player I plays  and player II plays , then player I pays  to player II).

The Helly metric  is defined as

The metric so defined is symmetric, reflexive, and satisfies the triangle inequality.

The Helly metric measures distances between strategies, not in terms of the differences between the strategies themselves, but in terms of the consequences of the strategies. Two strategies are distant if their payoffs are different.

If one stipulates that  implies  then the topology so induced is called the natural topology.

The metric on the space of player II's strategies is analogous:

Note that  thus defines two Helly metrics: one for each player's strategy space.

Conditional compactness

Any game that is conditionally compact in the Helly metric has an -optimal strategy for any . Moreover, if the space of strategies for one player is conditionally compact, then the space of strategies for the other player is conditionally compact (in their Helly metric).

References
N. N. Vorob'ev 1977.  Game theory lectures for economists and systems scientists.  Springer-Verlag (translated by S. Kotz).

Game theory